Leuconostoc gelidum is a Gram-positive lactic acid bacterium; its type strain is NCFB 2775. Its genome has been sequenced. Its name derives from the fact that it was first isolated from chill-stored meats.

References

Further reading

Kim, Bong-Joon, et al. "Identification and Characterization of Leuconostoc gelidum. Isolated from Kimchi, a Fermented Cabbage Product." JOURNAL OF MICROBIOLOGY-SEOUL- 38.3 (2000): 132–136.

External links
LPSN

Type strain of Leuconostoc gelidum at BacDive -  the Bacterial Diversity Metadatabase

Lactobacillaceae
Bacteria described in 1989